Juergen Pirner (born 1956) is the German creator of Jabberwock, a chatterbot that won the 2003 Loebner prize.

Pirner created Jabberwock modelling the Jabberwocky from Lewis Carroll's poem of the same name. Initially, Jabberwock would just give rude or fantasy-related answers; but over the years, Pirner has programmed better responses into it. As of 2007 he has taught it 2.7 million responses.

Pirner lives in Hamburg, Germany.

References

External links
Talk to Jabberwock

1956 births
German computer scientists
Artificial intelligence researchers
Living people